The men's Greco-Roman 85 kilograms is a competition featured at the 2001 World Wrestling Championships, and was held at the Dimitris Tofalos Arena in Patras, Greece from 7 to 9 December 2001.

Medalists

Results

Preliminary round

Pool 1

Pool 2

Pool 3

Pool 4

Pool 5

Pool 6

Pool 7

Pool 8

Pool 9

Knockout round

References

Men's Greco-Roman 85 kg